An Australian rules football playing field is a venue where Australian rules football is played.

The playing field is typically a large oval-shaped grass surface, usually a modified cricket field.  These fields may vary especially for variations of the game.  However, for official Australian Football League matches, strict requirement specifications must be met for stadiums.

Standard specifications

Ground dimensions
Australian rules football grounds, even at the highest level of the game, have no fixed dimensions. Grounds can vary from long and narrow to almost circular, and are not necessarily symmetrical, depending upon how and where the field was constructed. At least  of space between the boundary line and any fence is required for safety.

Smaller fields are generally used for junior football; some are purpose-built, and some are temporarily marked out within the confines of full-sized oval; as for a senior match, there are no fixed dimensions for a junior-sized field. The Western Australian Football Commission advises that a good rule of thumb is to set the length of the field equivalent to  times the length of an average kick of the age group playing.

Ground markings

A top-level Australian rules football ground has the following markings:
This the area through which points are scored.
Two boundary lines, which are curved around the edge of the field and connect the two goal-lines. Together, the boundary-lines and the goal-lines mark out the playing area, in a slightly truncated oval.
The line parallel to the goal line is called the kick-off line. This marks out the area from which a kick-in is taken.
The imaginary continuation of the kick-off line in both directions is called the nine-metre line; it is not marked, but radial markings outside the boundary line, two at each end of the ground, indicate where the nine-metre line crosses the boundary line. The position of a mark or free kick taken on the defensive side of this line is always advanced to it.
Two blue dots,  in front of the centre of each kick-off line, indicating where the man on the mark stands for a kick-in.
This square dictates how many midfielders can be present at a centre bounce.
These markings dictate where the ruckmen and other midfielders can stand during a centre bounce.
Originally introduced as a visual indicator of distance only, these markings now dictate starting positions for forwards and defenders at a centre bounce. Some competitions and exhibition games also allow for super goals, which score more points for a goal kicked from long range.
Interchange gates: a series of yellow and white markings on the boundary line near the teams' interchange benches, which dictate where players may enter and exit the ground for interchanges.

Grounds at lower or junior levels will lack many of these markings, or paint them in lower detail.

Goal posts
A further  on either side of these are behind posts; the behind posts are shorter than the goal posts; additionally, in South Australia it is customary for behind posts to be painted red,  in height. All posts are typically padded with wall padding to minimise injury due to players colliding with them.

Surface
Due to possible injuries caused to players moving at high speed by marking, jumping, turning and being tackled without protective padding, the playing field standards imply use of lawn as a surface.

Purpose-built stadiums

Almost all Australian rules football fields are of a suitable size and shape for cricket; and in the majority of cases, the fields are used for cricket in the summer and Australian rules football in the winter, a seasonal strategy which is part of the history of Australian sport. As a consequence of this, there are very few fields which were purpose-built for and used by Australian rules football to the exclusion of cricket and all other sports.

However, there are many grounds – particularly those built more recently – which were built with Australian rules football as the primary intended purpose, but upon which other sports, including cricket, have been played.

Variations

Variations of the standard field dimensions and layout exist.  For junior levels, smaller fields are often used.  Rectangular fields have also been used in the past in Australia and also overseas, as well as adapted fields from other sports such as Association Football and American Football.

References

Sports venues by type

Sports rules and regulations
Grass field surfaces